MSU Soccer Park at Pittser Field is a soccer-specific stadium on the campus of Montclair State University in Montclair, New Jersey. Built on the site of a former baseball field, MSU Soccer Park opened in 1998 as the home of the Montclair State Red Hawks men's and women's soccer teams.

From 2007 to 2013, Montclair State was the training site for the Major League Soccer club New York Red Bulls while their Red Bull Training Facility was constructed in nearby Hanover Township, New Jersey. The Red Bulls helped finance the construction of a new field house, as well as the installation of a FIFA approved FieldTurf surface at MSU Soccer Park. Lights were installed in 2012 allowing for night matches to be played.

In 2016 it was announced that the Red Bulls' USL Championship affiliate club, New York Red Bulls II, would move into MSU Soccer Park in 2017. To accommodate the Red Bulls II, MSU Soccer Park underwent significant renovations to keep the facility in line with stadium standards set by the United States Soccer Federation for lower division professional soccer clubs. MSU Soccer Park's capacity was expanded to 3,000 seats for the 2017 season and again by 1,500 seats in 2018 bringing the total capacity to 5,000 seats. In addition to the expanded seating capacity, the club built new locker rooms adjacent to the playing field and upgraded the FieldTurf playing surface. The renovations were made ahead of and during the 2018 USL season, forcing the Red Bulls II to play their first six home matches at Red Bull Arena.

In December 2016, Major League Soccer Commissioner Don Garber, a Montclair resident, became the first season ticketholder for Red Bulls II at MSU Soccer Park. At this event, it was also announced that MSU Soccer Park would host select matches for New York Red Bulls U-23, the MLS franchise's affiliate club in USL League Two.

Notable matches

References

External links
 MSU Soccer Park - Facilities
 New York Red Bulls II

1998 establishments in New Jersey
Montclair, New Jersey
New York Red Bulls II
Soccer venues in New Jersey
USL Championship stadiums